Komla Agbeli Gbedemah (17 June 1913 – 11 July 1998) was a Ghanaian politician and Minister for Finance in Ghana's Nkrumah government between 1954 and 1961. Known popularly as "Afro Gbede", he was an indigene of Anyako in the Volta Region of Ghana.

Early life and career
Komla Gbedemah was born on 17 June 1913 in Warri, Nigeria, of Ewe parentage. He attended Adisadel College in Cape Coast for his secondary education from 1925 to 1929 and Achimota College from 1929 to 1933.
He became employed as a teacher at a school in the Akuapem District in the Eastern Region of Ghana. In 1939, he became a Science Master at Accra Academy in Jamestown. Alongside teaching, he engaged in the timber and confectionery business. In 1943, he quit his teaching role at Accra Academy to engage in the timber trade full-time.

Political career 

Gbedemah was originally a member of the United Gold Coast Convention. He left with Dr Kwame Nkrumah to form the Convention People's Party (CPP). Gbedemah was an important member of the CPP because of his organizational ability. He was influential in getting Nkrumah elected to the Legislative Council on 8 February 1951 at the Elections for the Legislative Assembly. He organized Nkrumah's entire campaign while Nkrumah was still in prison, detained by the colonial government. Nkrumah duly won the Accra Central Municipal seat. This led to Nkrumah being released on 12 February 1951 and his being invited to form a government. Gbedemah is in some reports named as being the first to welcome Nkrumah after his release from Fort James prison.

Gbedemah, who himself got elected into the Legislative Assembly, became the first Ghanaian Minister for Health and Labour in Nkrumah's government. In 1954, he became the Minister of Finance, a position he held for seven years. He was influential in getting an initially reluctant United States government to back the building of the Akosombo Dam. Later, as his relationship with Nkrumah deteriorated, Gbedemah was demoted by Nkrumah to the post of Minister of Health in May 1961. It is alleged by US sources that at a point, Gbedemah was considering the overthrow of Nkrumah. He is quoted as saying: "I would be sorry to have to do it but country has had enough of Nkrumah's arrogance, whims and madness." Nkrumah demanded Gbedemah's resignation in September 1961.

Gbedemah was forced into exile later the same year, after worsening relations between him and Nkrumah over what he perceived to be Nkrumah's financial indiscipline. He is alleged to have fled as there were plans to place him under preventive detention. While in exile, he is known to have continued to lobby the US over the Akosombo dam project.

Gbedemah formed and led the National Alliance of Liberals into the 1969 general election. His campaign slogan "Say it loud, I am black and proud!" was taken from the popular James Brown tune. After the election, Gbedemah was barred from taking his seat in parliament. This followed a Supreme Court ruling, upholding the NLC barring members of the CPP accused of financial crimes from holding public office for ten years. This decision led him to retire from active involvement in politics.

From 1957 to 1961, Gbedemah served as President of the World Federalist Movement, an international non-governmental organization promoting federal world government.

Howard Johnson's restaurant incident
In the United States, Gbedemah is most widely known from an incident on 10 October 1957 when U.S. President Dwight D. Eisenhower apologized to him after he was refused service in a Howard Johnson's restaurant in Dover, Delaware. Gbedemah told the staff: "The people here are of a lower social status than I am, but they can drink here and we can't. You can keep the orange juice and the change, but this is not the last you have heard of this." The incident resulted in Gbedemah being invited to breakfast at the White House.

Positions 
For ministerial positions, see succession box.
Leader, People's Movement for Freedom and Justice (1991 – ?)
Founder and Leader, National Alliance of Liberals (1969)
Member, Legislative Assembly, Ghana (1951 – ?)
Manager and Editor, Accra Evening News (1949 – ?)
Vice Chairman, Convention People's Party (1949 – ?)

Works 
Gbedemah, K. A. It will not be "work and happiness for all"; an open letter being also an appeal to Dr. Kwame Nkrumah and comment on and criticism of the proposed new 7 year Ghana development plan. [n.p.], 1962. [32p].

Notes 

1913 births
1998 deaths
Ghanaian MPs 1951–1954
Ghanaian MPs 1954–1956
Ghanaian MPs 1956–1965
Ghanaian MPs 1965–1966
Finance ministers of Ghana
Health ministers of Ghana
Labour ministers of Ghana
Industry ministers of Ghana
Trade ministers of Ghana
United Gold Coast Convention politicians
Convention People's Party (Ghana) politicians
National Alliance of Liberals politicians
Ewe people
Ghanaian independence activists
Alumni of Achimota School
Alumni of Adisadel College